The House of Baglioni is an Umbrian noble family that ruled over the city of Perugia between 1438 and 1540, when Rodolfo II Baglioni had to surrender the city to the papal troops of Pope Paul III after the Salt War. At that point, Perugia came under the control of the Papal States.

Descendants of the family exist to the present day, including the French branch of Baglion de la Dufferie, which once owned the Château de la Motte-Husson in the Mayenne department of France, which is the setting for the Channel 4 programme Escape to the Chateau.

History

Lords of Perugia (1438–1540)

Notable members

 Malatesta Baglioni (d. 1437)
 Grifone Baglioni
 Braccio I Baglioni (1419 - December 1479), son of Malatesta Baglioni
 Carlo Baglioni (di Malatesta) (d. 1485)
 Orazio Baglioni
 Gentile Baglioni (1466 - August 1527)
 Carlo Baglioni (1473 - December 1518)
 Giampaolo Baglioni (- June 1520)
 Astorre Baglioni (di Guido)
 Grifonetto Baglioni
 Morgante Baglioni (d. July 1502)
 Orazio di Giampaolo Baglioni (1493 - May 1528)
 Malatesta IV Baglioni (di Giampaolo) (1491 - December 1531)
 Sforza Baglioni (d. September 1532)
 Braccio II Baglioni (d. November 1559)
 Rodolfo II Baglioni (July 1512 - March 1554)
 Federico Baglioni
 Astorre Baglioni (March 1526 - 4 August 1571)
 Adriano Baglioni (March 1527 - April 1574)

References

External links 

 Maison de Baglion 
 Biographies of the Baglioni – Condottieridiventura.it 
 Famille Baglioni 
 Baglion de la Dufferie 

People from Perugia
History of Umbria